Karaikal Kailasanathar Temple is a major temple in Karaikal, India. It is located opposite to another notable temple, the Karaikal Ammaiyar Temple. The main deity worshipped at the temple is Lord Kailasanathar (the Lord in Mount Kailash, the Lord Shiva).

History
The temple is believed to have been constructed before 2000 years ago which makes it the oldest temple in Karaikal district. It was reconstructed by the Pallavas in the 8th century and again in the French rule. The temple is constructed in a large complex surrounding it making it the largest temple complex of the famous temples in Karaikal city. The main attraction of the temple be the four elaborate doorways in each directions of the temple complex. The street where the temple located is named after the temple as Kailasanathar Kovil street.

Sanctums in the Temple
The temple has sanctums for:
 Lord Kailasanathar
 Goddess Soundarambal
 Lord Nataraja
 Lord Dakshinamurthy
 Lord Vinayaga
 Different Lingas
 Two sanctums for Lord Muruga along with Goddess Devasena and Goddess Valli
 Goddess Saraswati
 Goddess Lakshmi
 Small statues of 63 nayanmars
 Goddess Durgai
 Lord Chandikeshwara
 Navagrahas

Festivals

Mangani Festival
The Mangani Festival is associated with both Kailasanathar Temple and Karaikal Ammaiyar Temple. The important figure of the Mangani festival, Lord Bikshatanamurthy is of the Kailasanathar Temple.

Ammaiyar was called as Mother (Amma) by Load Shiva (who is not having father or mother) since Lord Shiva called Ammaiyar as mother Shiva became native of Karaikal.

Also Lord Shiva has given the position to Ammaiyar to seat below his foot in Nataraja position which is given this position to only to Karaikal Ammaiyar punithavathi

Float Festival in Chandra Theertham
The temple tank Chandra Theertham is associated with the main three temples of Karaikal. The Float festivals (தெப்பத்திருவிழா) in Karaikal with the idols of Lord Kailasanathar from this temple and Lord Nithyakalyana Perumal from the perumal temple is an important festival celebrated here.

Karaikal Chariot festival
The chariot of Karaikal is dedicated to Kailasanathar Temple. The Karaikal Chariot festival is celebrated once a year. The idol of Lord Kailasanathar is taken in the chariot through the important streets of Karaikal. The cord of the chariot is held and pulled by the devotees to move the chariot forward.

References

Karaikal
Shiva temples in Puducherry